is a 2020 Japanese animated romance film based on L'étranger de la Plage manga series written and illustrated by Kanna Kii. The film is written and directed by Akiyo Ohashi, and produced by Studio Hibari. The film was released in Japan on September 11, 2020.

Funimation acquired the streaming rights for the film, and released on its website on July 9, 2021.

Synopsis
In a remote island of Okinawa, Shun, a gay aspiring novelist meets Mio, a high school boy who lost his parents at an early age. The two grows closer together, but Mio unexpectedly leaves Okinawa. Three years later, Mio returns to face his feelings.

Voice cast

Production
In October 15, 2019, it was announced that an anime film adaptation of Kanna Kii's L'étranger de la Plage manga was in development, with the film being directed and written by Akiyo Ohashi at Studio Hibari, while Kii had provided the character designs. Fuji TV's new boys' love (yaoi) anime label, Blue Lynx handled the development of the film. On March 31, 2020, Taishi Murata and Yoshitsugu Matsuoka were cast as Shun and Mio respectively. In July 28, 2020, it was announced that Japanese band Mono no Aware provided the theme song for the film, titled .

Release
The film was released in theaters in Japan on September 11, 2020. Funimation acquired the streaming rights for the film, and released on its website in the United States, Canada, United Kingdom, Ireland, Australia, New Zealand, Brazil and Mexico on July 9, 2021.

Reception
Kim Morrisy of Anime News Network gave the film a B- rating, and stated "I think that it needed more time to develop its characters, especially Mio, more effectively, but there were tantalizing glimpses of a satisfying love story here." Matt Schley from The Japan Times rated the film 2.5 out of 5, and stated "In adapting the excellent manga, the team behind this film have proved once again that more is less."

Notes

References

External links
 

2020 anime films
2020s Japanese films
Studio Hibari
Japanese LGBT-related films
LGBT-related animated films
2020 LGBT-related films